Hansjörg Vogel (born 16 March 1951 in Bern) is a Swiss  theologian who was from 1994 until his resignation in 1995 the Roman Catholic bishop of the Basel.

Life 
On 28 November 1976, he received his priestly ordination. After his election as bishop of Basel and the confirmation by the Pope John Paul II, he was nominated as bishop on 4 April 1994. The episcopal consecration was given by his predecessor in office, Otto Wüst. On 2 June 1995, he resigned from his office after it became known that he would soon be a father.

He then married the woman who was the mother of his child. He worked from 1996 to 1998 as a project manager at Refugee Services of the Swiss Labor Assistance and was a scientific assistant at the Red Cross Swiss Therapy. Incidentally, he trained as an analytical psychologist at Carl Gustav Jung Institute in Kuesnacht. Since January 2001, he is an Immigration and Integration Officer working at the Canton of Lucerne.

Works 

In German:

Busse als ganzheitliche Erneuerung. Praktischtheologische Perspektiven einer zeitgemässen Umkehrpraxis dargestellt am Fastenopfer der Schweizer Katholiken. Universitäts-Verlag, Freiburg im Üechtland 1990,  (Praktische Theologie im Dialog. Vol 4).

Literature 

In German:

 Stephan Leimgruber:Hansjörg Vogel (1993-1994) – Bischof in radikal pluralistischer Gesellschaft.In: Urban Fink, Stephan Leimgruber (eds.):Die Bischöfe von Basel 1794–1995.Universitäts-Verlag, Freiburg im Üechtland 1996, p. 377-400.

References

External links 
 Hansjörg Vogel at catholic-hierarchy.org

Bishops of Basel
1951 births
Living people
People from Bern
Laicized Roman Catholic bishops
20th-century Roman Catholic bishops in Switzerland